The 2004 Huntingdonshire District Council election took place on 10 June 2004 to elect members of Huntingdonshire District Council in Cambridgeshire, England. The whole council was up for election after boundary changes reduced the number of seats by 1. The Conservative Party stayed in overall control of the council.

Election result

Ward results

By-elections between 2004 and 2006

References

2004 English local elections
2004
2000s in Cambridgeshire